The Filipino Christian Church is an historic Christian Church (Disciples of Christ) church located at 301 N. Union Avenue in the Westlake neighborhood of Los Angeles, California. Built in 1915, the Craftsman-style building features stained-glass windows. The church was designated Los Angeles Historic-Cultural Monument No. 651 in 1998, and added to the National Register of Historic Places on January 4, 2019.

References

External links

1915 establishments in California
Churches on the National Register of Historic Places in California
Filipino-American culture in California
Churches completed in 1915